Antônio Cardoso (born February 7, 1957 in Miguel) is a Brazilian singer and songwriter of Christian songs, particularly of Catholic music.

Biography 

Son of Antônio Silva de Carvalho and Sílvia Cardoso de Carvalho, Antônio was born in Miguel Calmon, Bahia. He learned musical culture from his father who was a musician and from 1975 he moved to São Paulo and then as a musician was supported by Padre Zezinho. Initially he was part of LP's in the Pauline Editions and since 1979 started a solo career. From 1986 until 1989, he paused his recording career to perform in Brazil.

Discography 

 Direitos de Menino, 1979
 Migrante, 1980, (first solo LP)
 Histórias da gente, 1981
 Teimosia, 1982
 Trilhos de fé, 1985
 Antonio Cardoso, 1989, with Padre Zezinho's participation
 Juntos, 1990
 Quando se vive um grande amor, 1991, double with Padre Zezinho
 Diante de ti, 1992
 Amor de Pai, 1993
 Antonio Cardoso, 1994
 Aprendiz, 1996, Padre Zezinho's production
 Juntos, 1998
 Quando se vive um grande amor, 2001
 Diante de ti, 2004
 Amor de Pai, 2007
 Pede um amor às estrelas, 2010
 Coletânea, 2012

Louvemos ao Senhor Trophy 

In 2016 Cardoso was one of the winners of the eighth edition of the Louvemos ao Senhor Trophy with liturgical songs:
"Na Tua Presença, Senhor" e “Uma Casa Iluminada por Jesus”, in the composer category.

See also 

 Padre Zezinho

References

External links 

Official site
Official Facebook

1957 births
Living people
Brazilian Roman Catholics
Brazilian Roman Catholic singers
People from Bahia